Andre R. Guttfreund (November 6, 1946) is a Salvadoran film director, producer and filmmaker. He is better known for the production of the 1976 short film In the Region of Ice, for which he received an Oscar at the 1977 Academy Awards with Peter Werner for Best Live Action Short Film, becoming the first and so far only Central American to receive an Oscar.

Biography 
Guttfreund was the eldest of five children and the son of a Romanian actress and a German diplomat. As a kid he studied at the Escuela Americana in San Salvador. When he was 13 years-old he travelled to the US and attended Verde Valley School in Sedona, Arizona, where he made friend of future El Salvador president Alfredo Cristiani, then he studied political science at Tufts University. He grew up bilingual, speaking Spanish and German. After his graduation in 1970, he received an invitation to get a Master in theater in London. After graduating from his master, Guttfreund was invited to El Salvador by Walter Béneke, the then Minister of Education of El Salvador, to start the Educative Television project with him. Guttfreund was director of the Educative Television project from 1971 to 1973. After that he came back to the US and studied production and directing at the American Film Institute Conservatory and graduated with a Master of Fine Arts degree.

In 1976, Guttfreund produced his first film In the Region of Ice, and received the Oscar in the category of Best Live Action Short Film, becoming the first and so far only Central American to receive an Oscar. He also directed and produced films such as the TV movie A Perfect Match (1980), the film romance Breach of Contract (1982), the sports drama Abduction of Carry Swenson (1987), the dramatic Western Cabalgando con la muerte (1989) and the mystery drama Femme Fatale (1991), starring Colin Firth, Lisa Zane and Billy Zane. He has also appeared in various roles in television series in the United States and Spain, such as the dramatic series L.A. Law and Picket Fences and the comedy series Periodistas.

He worked at the José Simeón Cañas Central American University's Centro de Audiovisuales and at the Verde Valley School. He has been president of the Salvadoran Film and Television Association (ASCINE) from 2012 to 2016. In this capacity, he also worked as an adviser to the Ministry of Economic Affairs between 2014 and 2016, he served as an adviser to the Film and Audiovisual Coordination Council and was appointed special envoy by the Ministry of Foreign Affairs.

Filmography

Film

Television

Videogames

Awards 
 Academy Awards 1977: Oscar winner in the category Best Live Action Short Film with In the Region of Ice.

References

External links

1946 births
Directors of Live Action Short Film Academy Award winners
Living people
Salvadoran film directors
Salvadoran people of German descent
Salvadoran people of Romanian descent